A Y-cable, Y cable, or splitter cable is a cable with three ends: one common end and two other ends. The Y-cable can resemble the Latin letter "Y".

Uses

Analog audio/video signals

There are five common uses for Y-cables in signal paths:

 combining signals (feeding two outputs to one input);
 splitting signals (feeding one output to two inputs);
 consolidating connectors (feeding signals from two output connectors to a multi-pole input connector, keeping the signals separate);
 un-consolidating connectors (feeding signals from one multi-pole output connector to two input connectors, keeping the signals separate);
 send and return (outbound signal on one leg of the "Y"; inbound signal on the other; signals kept separate).

A Y-cable common in domestic settings has a stereo 3.5mm (1/8″) stereo male minijack at one end, to plug into the line- or headphone-output of an MP3 player, mobile phone, or computer soundcard, and a pair of RCA (phono) male plugs to connect to the left and right mono inputs of an external amplifier. This is an example of un-consolidating connectors, as described above.

Power

Mains
Y-shaped mains leads enable two appliances to run from one mains plug.

Internal disk drives
In older desktop PCs, PATA (aka "IDE") devices such as 5.25 inch optical drives and 3.5 inch hard drives are typically powered by means of Molex connector Y-cables.

USB

Traditional USB Y-cables exist to enable one USB peripheral device to receive power from two USB host sockets at once, while only transceiving data with one of those sockets. As long as the host has two available USB sockets, this enables a peripheral that requires more power than one USB port can supply (but not more than two ports can supply) to be used without requiring a mains adaptor. Portable hard disk drives and optical disc drives are sometimes supplied with such Y-cables, for this reason.

A newer variant on this kind of cable allows a USB peripheral to receive data and power from two different devices respectively. This allows power-hungry peripherals to be used with sockets that are designed to supply little or no outgoing power, such as USB On-The-Go mini-B sockets on smartphones. The power is supplied to the third leg of the "Y" by a mains adaptor or a power bank.

Notes

References

Signal cables